Terminal Tower: An Archival Collection is a compilation album by American rock band Pere Ubu. Released in 1985, the album compiles several of the band's early singles and B-sides, including the Hearthan singles recorded with founder Peter Laughner that were initially compiled on the Datapanik in Year Zero EP, and continuing through later sides recorded with Mayo Thompson.

The original Rough Trade UK LP was fine, but the American Twin Tone LP and CD both played at slightly slow speed (about a half-tone flat) throughout, had the left and right channels reversed and suffered from generally poor sound compared to the UK LP or the US singles. Most of the compilation was properly remastered for the Datapanik in the Year Zero box set, and all subsequent individual reissues of the compilation have used that corrected master.

Track listing

Personnel
 Tom Herman – guitar, bass
 Peter Laughner – guitar, bass
 Tim Wright – bass, guitar
 Mayo Thompson – guitar
 Scott Krauss – drums
 Tony Maimone – bass
 Allen Ravenstine – EML synthesizers, saxophone, vocals  
 David Thomas – vocals, trombone
Chris Cutler - drums, percussion, sounds
 Dave Taylor – EML synthesizers, Acetone organ on "Final Solution" and "Cloud 149"
 Alan Greenblatt – rhythm guitar on "Untitled"

References

External links

 Stylus Magazine review

Pere Ubu albums
1985 compilation albums
Rough Trade Records compilation albums